John Evans House may refer to:

 John Evans House (Newark, Delaware), listed on the NRHP in New Castle County, Delaware
 John Evans House (Martinsburg, West Virginia), listed on the NRHP in Berkeley County, West Virginia

See also
 John Evans (disambiguation)
Evans House (disambiguation)